Michael Charles Faraday Proctor PhD (21 January 1929 – 24 October 2017) was an English botanist and plant ecologist, lecturer, scientific author based at the University of Exeter. He retired from his post as Reader in Plant Ecology at Exeter University in 1994.

M.C.F. Proctor published more than 100 research papers, and was regarded as one of Britain's pre-eminent plant ecologists. In 1968 he revised and updated Arthur Tansley's book 'Britain's Green Mantle'. He was a contributing author to all of the five volumes of the definitive work on British Plant Communities, edited by J.Rodwell (1991-2000), and also wrote three books in the New Naturalist Series: two on pollination, and one on the vegetation of Britain and Ireland.

Academic career
Proctor studied botany, zoology and chemistry for his undergraduate degree at Cambridge University, then did research on rock-roses (Helianthemum). In 1956 he published a significant work on the bryophyte flora of Cambridgeshire, which embodied "the accumulation of Cambridgeshire bryophyte records begun by Prof. P.W. Richards in 1927". Proctor’s flora set out the history of bryophyte recording in the vice-county of Cambridgeshire and provided a guide to the main habitats. It was the first detailed account of the bryophytes of that county since 1820, when the third edition of Relhan’s Flora Cantabrigiensis was published.

Proctor's interest in insects and pollination ecology dated from his student days, shared with Peter Yeo at Cambridge, and with whom he remained a life-long friend. After leaving Cambridge, Proctor was employed by the Nature Conservancy in North Wales for two years, before joining the Department of Biological Sciences at the University of Exeter in November 1956 where he taught botany and ecology until retiring in September 1994. His main research interests have included distribution and ecophysiology of bryophytes, especially with reference to the Dartmoor oakwoods such as Wistman's Wood; the vegetation and water chemistry of blanket bogs and mires, plus the distribution, ecology and physiology of the filmy ferns, Hymenophyllum tunbrigense and H. wilsonii.

Proctor was editor of Watsonia, the journal of the then Botanical Society of the British Isles from April 1961 to July 1971.

Honours and recognition
Proctor was a foreign member of the Norwegian Academy of Sciences as well as being an honorary member of the Hungarian Society for Plant Physiology. He was also a Fellow of the Royal Photographic Society, a founder member of the Devon Wildlife Trust, and between 1969 and 1981 he was a trustee of Paignton Zoo, and was reappointed trustee again in 1991.

His contribution to botany and to the study of Whitebeam (Sorbus spp) in particular is honoured in the naming of a species of hybrid Rowan, of which only one plant is known to exist in the wild.  Proctor’s Rowan (Sorbus x proctoris T.Rich) has Rowan (Sorbus aucuparia L.) and Sichuan Rowan (S. scalaris Koehne) as its parents and was discovered in the Avon Gorge.

Selected publications

References

New Naturalist writers
English botanists
Academics of the University of Exeter
Members of the Norwegian Academy of Science and Letters
1929 births
2017 deaths